Parc National des Monts-Valin is one of twenty-nine national parks of Quebec, managed by the Quebec Outdoor Establishments Company (Sépaq). Located in Saguenay, the highest point of the region is found in Monts-Valin at Dubuc peak, as well as several other peaks reaching over 900 meters above sea level. It was established in 1996 to conserve a representative example of Mount Valin. For many years, the park has been a destination of choice for all outdoor enthusiasts, both summer and winter.

Biodiversity 
So far, botanists have identified 442 species of plants in Monts-Valin.

Likewise, thirty-seven species of mammals have been observed inside the park. The most frequently sighted mammals are the moose, the North American beaver, the fisher, the white-tailed deer, and the woodland caribou. Hairs of the eastern cougar were also collected in 2002, possibly confirming the previous presence of this predator around the park territory.

The only classes of reptiles that have been identified in the park's territory are the common garter snake and the northern redbelly snake. The latter is rare in this region, as it has only been identified within park territory in 2006.

Amphibians, on the other hand, are numerous in the territory, with eleven distinct species divided into six families. The various wetlands distributed over the park are home to, among others, the American toad, the spring peeper, the wood frog, the green frog, the eastern newt, the spotted salamander, and the red-backed salamander.

References
Content in this edit is translated from the existing French Wikipedia article at Parc national des Monts-Valin; see its history for attribution.

External links

Monts-Valin National Park - official site

National parks of Quebec
Tourist attractions in Saguenay–Lac-Saint-Jean
Protected areas of Saguenay–Lac-Saint-Jean
Canada geography articles needing translation from French Wikipedia